Hypermobility, also known as double-jointedness, describes joints that stretch farther than normal. For example, some hypermobile people can bend their thumbs backwards to their wrists, bend their knee joints backwards, put their leg behind the head or perform other contortionist "tricks". It can affect one or more joints throughout the body.

Hypermobile joints are common and occur in about 10 to 25% of the population, but in a minority of people, pain and other symptoms are present. This may be a sign of what is known as joint hypermobility syndrome (JMS) or, more recently, hypermobility spectrum disorder (HSD). Hypermobile joints are a feature of genetic connective tissue disorders such as hypermobility spectrum disorder (HSD) or Ehlers–Danlos syndromes (EDS). Until new diagnostic criteria were introduced, hypermobility syndrome was sometimes considered identical to hypermobile Ehlers–Danlos syndrome (hEDS), formerly called EDS Type 3. As no genetic test can distinguish the two conditions and because of the similarity of the diagnostic criteria and recommended treatments, many experts recommend they be recognized as the same condition until further research is undertaken.

In 2016 the diagnostic criteria for hEDS were re-written to be more restrictive, with the intent of narrowing the pool of hEDS patients in the hope of making it easier to identify a common genetic mutation, hEDS being the only EDS variant without a diagnostic DNA test. At the same time hypermobility spectrum disorder was renamed as hypermobility spectrum disorder and redefined as a hypermobility disorder that does not meet the diagnostic criteria for hEDS, other types of Ehlers-Danlos Syndrome, or other heritable Connective Tissue Disorder (such as Marfan's, Loeys-Dietz, or osteogenesis imperfecta).

Signs and symptoms 

People with Joint Hypermobility Syndrome may develop other conditions caused by their unstable joints. These conditions include:
 Joint instability causing frequent sprains, tendinitis, or bursitis when doing activities that would not affect others
 Joint pain
 Early-onset osteoarthritis (as early as during teen years)
 Subluxations or dislocations, especially in the shoulder (severe limits on one's ability to push, pull, grasp, finger, reach, etc., is considered a disability by the US Social Security Administration)
 Knee pain
 Fatigue, even after short periods of exercise
 Back pain, prolapsed discs or spondylolisthesis
 Joints that make clicking noises (also a symptom of osteoarthritis)
 Susceptibility to whiplash
 Temporomandibular joint dysfunction, also known as TMD
 Increased nerve compression disorders (such as carpal tunnel syndrome)
 The ability of finger locking
 Poor response to anaesthetic or pain medication
 "Growing pains" as described in children in late afternoon or night

Associated conditions
Those with hypermobile joints are more likely to have fibromyalgia, mitral valve prolapse, and anxiety disorders such as panic disorder.

Causes 

Hypermobility generally results from one or more of the following:
 Abnormally shaped ends of one or more bones at a joint
 A defect of Type 1 collagen (as found in Ehlers–Danlos syndrome) or other connective tissue (as found in Loeys–Dietz syndrome and Marfan syndrome) resulting in weakened ligaments/ligamentous laxity, muscles and tendons. This same defect also results in weakened bones, which may result in osteoporosis and fractures.
 Abnormal joint proprioception (an impaired ability to locate body parts in space and/or monitor an extended joint)

These abnormalities cause abnormal joint stress, meaning that the joints can wear out, leading to osteoarthritis.

The condition tends to run in families, suggesting a genetic basis for at least some forms of hypermobility. The term double jointed is often used to describe hypermobility; however, the name is a misnomer and should not be taken literally, as hypermobile joints are not doubled/extra in any sense.

Most people have hypermobility with no other symptoms. Approximately 5% of the healthy population have one or more hypermobile joints. However, people with "joint hypermobility syndrome" are subject to many difficulties. For example, their joints may be easily injured, be more prone to complete dislocation due to the weakly stabilized joint and they may develop problems from muscle fatigue (as muscles must work harder to compensate for weakness in the ligaments that support the joints). Hypermobility syndrome can lead to chronic pain or even disability in severe cases. Musical instrumentalists with hypermobile fingers may have difficulties when fingers collapse into the finger locking position. Or, conversely, they may display superior abilities due to their increased range of motion for fingering, such as in playing a violin or cello.

Hypermobility may be symptomatic of a serious medical condition, such as Stickler syndrome, Ehlers–Danlos syndrome, Marfan syndrome, Loeys–Dietz syndrome, rheumatoid arthritis, osteogenesis imperfecta, lupus, polio, Down syndrome, morquio syndrome, cleidocranial dysostosis or myotonia congenita.

Hypermobility has been associated with chronic fatigue syndrome and fibromyalgia. Hypermobility causes physical trauma (in the form of joint dislocations, joint subluxations, joint instability, sprains, etc.). These conditions often, in turn, cause physical and/or emotional trauma and are possible triggers for conditions such as fibromyalgia.

Women with hypermobility may experience particular difficulties when pregnant. During pregnancy, the body releases relaxin and, certain hormones that alter ligament physiology, easing the stretching needed to accommodate fetal growth as well as the birthing process. The combination of hypermobility and pregnancy-related pelvic girdle during pregnancy can be debilitating. The pregnant woman with hypermobile joints will often be in significant pain as muscles and joints adapt to the pregnancy. Pain often inhibits such women from standing or walking during pregnancy. The pregnant patient may be forced to use a bedpan and/or a wheelchair during pregnancy and may experience permanent disability. 

Symptoms of hypermobility include a dull but intense pain around the knee and ankle joints and the soles of the feet. The pain and discomfort affecting these body parts can be alleviated by using custom orthoses.

Syndromes

Hypermobility syndrome is generally considered to comprise hypermobility together with other symptoms, such as myalgia and arthralgia. It is relatively common among children and affects more females than males.

Current thinking suggests four causative factors:
 The shape of the ends of the bones—Some joints normally have a large range of movement, such as the shoulder and hip. Both are ball-and-socket joints. If a shallow rather than a deep socket is inherited, a relatively large range of movement will be possible. If the socket is particularly shallow, then the joint may dislocate easily.
 Protein deficiency or hormone problems—Ligaments are made up of several types of protein fibre. These proteins include elastin, which gives elasticity and which may be altered in some people. Female sex hormones alter collagen proteins. Women are generally more supple just before a period and even more so in the latter stages of pregnancy, because of a hormone called relaxin that allows the pelvis to expand so the head of the baby can pass. Joint mobility differs by race, which may reflect differences in collagen protein structure. People from the Indian sub-continent, for example, often have more supple hands than Caucasians.
 Muscle tone—The tone of muscles is controlled by the nervous system, and influences range of movement. Special techniques can change muscle tone and increase flexibility. Yoga, for example, can help to relax muscles and make the joints more supple. However, yoga is not recommended by most medical professionals for people with Joint Hypermobility Syndrome, due to the likelihood of damage to the joints. Gymnasts and athletes can sometimes acquire hypermobility in some joints through activity.
 Proprioception—Compromised ability to detect exact joint/body position with closed eyes, may lead to overstretching and hypermobile joints.

Hypermobility can also be caused by connective tissue disorders, such as Ehlers–Danlos syndrome (EDS) and Marfan syndrome. Joint hypermobility is a common symptom for both. EDS has numerous sub-types; most include hypermobility in some degree. When hypermobility is the main symptom, then EDS/hypermobility type is likely. People with EDS-HT experience frequent joint dislocations and subluxations (partial/incomplete dislocations), with or without trauma, sometimes spontaneously. Commonly, hypermobility is dismissed by medical professionals as nonsignificant.

Ehlers–Danlos syndrome hypermobility type 
Joint hypermobility is often correlated with hypermobile Ehlers–Danlos syndrome (hEDS, known also by EDS type III or Ehlers–Danlos syndrome hypermobility type (EDS-HT)). Ehlers–Danlos syndrome is a genetic disorder caused by mutations or hereditary genes, but the genetic defect that produced hEDS is largely unknown. In conjunction with joint hypermobility, a common symptom for hEDS is smooth, velvety, and stretchy skin; a symptom largely unique to the syndrome. When diagnosing hEDS, the Beighton Criteria are used, but are not always able to distinguish between generalized hypermobility and hEDS.

Ehlers–Danlos hypermobility type can have severe musculoskeletal effects, including:
 Jaw laxity that may make an individual's jaw open and close like a hinge, as well as open further than the average.
 Neck pain that can lead to chronic headaches and is usually associated with a crackling or grinding sensation (crepitus).
 The spine may end up in a "round back" or inversely may extend too much into hyperlordosis. Individuals may also experience scoliosis.
 Joints commonly associated with hypermobility (wrists, knees, ankles, elbows, shoulders) may be at more severe risk to dislocate or strain.

Diagnosis 
Joint hypermobility syndrome shares symptoms with other conditions such as Marfan syndrome, Ehlers-Danlos Syndrome, and osteogenesis imperfecta. Experts in connective tissue disorders formally agreed that severe forms of Hypermobility Syndrome and mild forms of Ehlers-Danlos Syndrome Hypermobility Type are the same disorder. 

Generalized hypermobility is a common feature in all these hereditary connective tissue disorders and many features overlap, but often features are present that enable differentiating these disorders.
The inheritance pattern of Ehlers-Danlos syndrome varies by type. The arthrochalasia, classic, hypermobility and vascular forms usually have an autosomal dominant pattern of inheritance. Autosomal dominant inheritance occurs when one copy of a gene in each cell is sufficient to cause a disorder. In some cases, an affected person inherits the mutation from one affected parent. Other cases result from new (sporadic) gene mutations. Such cases can occur in people with no history of the disorder in their family.

The dermatosparaxis and kyphoscoliosis types of EDS and some cases of the classic and hypermobility forms, are inherited in an autosomal recessive pattern. In autosomal recessive inheritance, two copies of the gene in each cell are altered. Most often, both parents of an individual with an autosomal recessive disorder are carriers of one copy of the altered gene but do not show signs and symptoms of the disorder.

Beighton criteria 

As of July 2000, hypermobility was diagnosed using the Beighton criteria. In 2017, the criteria changed, but still involve the Beighton score. The Beighton criteria do not replace the Beighton score but instead use the previous score in conjunction with other symptoms and criteria. HMS is diagnosed in the presence of either two major criteria, one major and two minor criteria, or four minor criteria. The criteria are:

Major criteria 
 A Beighton score of 5/9 or more (either current or historic)
 Arthralgia for more than three months in four or more joints

Minor criteria 
 A Beighton score of 1, 2 or 3/9 (0, 1, 2 or 3 if aged 50+)
 Arthralgia (> 3 months) in one to three joints or back pain (> 3 months), spondylosis, spondylolysis/spondylolisthesis.
 Dislocation/subluxation in more than one joint, or in one joint on more than one occasion.
 Soft tissue rheumatism. > 3 lesions (e.g. epicondylitis, tenosynovitis, bursitis).
 Marfanoid habitus (tall, slim, span/height ratio >1.03, upper: lower segment ratio less than 0.89, arachnodactyly; positive Steinberg finger / Walker wrist signs).
 Abnormal skin: striae, hyperextensibility, thin skin, papyraceous scarring.

Beighton score 

The Beighton score is an edited version of the Carter/Wilkinson scoring system which was used for many years as an indicator of widespread hyper-mobility. Medical professionals varied in their interpretations of the results; some accepting as low as 1/9 and some 4/9 as a diagnosis of HMS. Therefore, it was incorporated, with clearer guidelines, into the Beighton Criteria. The Beighton score is measured by adding 1 point for each of the following:
 Placing flat hands on the floor with straight legs
 Left knee bending backward
 Right knee bending backward
 Left elbow bending backward
 Right elbow bending backward
 Left thumb touching the forearm
 Right thumb touching the forearm
 Left little finger bending backward past 90 degrees
 Right little finger bending backward past 90 degrees

Treatments

Physical therapy 

It is important that hypermobile individuals remain fit – even more so than the average individual – to prevent recurrent injuries. Regular exercise and exercise that is supervised by a physician and physical therapist can reduce symptoms because strong muscles increase dynamic joint stability. Low-impact exercise such as closed kinetic chain exercises are usually recommended as they are less likely to cause injury when compared to high-impact exercise or contact sports.

Heat and cold treatment can help temporarily to relieve the pain of aching joints and muscles but does not address the underlying problems.

Medication 

Medication is not the primary treatment for hypermobility, but can be used as an adjunct treatment for related joint pain. Nonsteroidal anti-inflammatory drugs are the primary medications of choice. Narcotics are not recommended for primary or long-term treatment and are reserved for short-term use after acute injury.

Lifestyle modification 

For some people with hypermobility, lifestyle changes decrease symptom severity. In general, activity that increases pain is to be avoided. For example:
 Typing can reduce pain from writing.
 Voice control software or a more ergonomic keyboard can reduce pain from typing.
 Bent knees or sitting can reduce pain from standing.
 Unwanted symptoms are frequently reduced by some forms of yoga and weightlifting.
 Use of low impact elliptical trainer machines can replace high-impact running.
 Pain-free swimming may require a kickboard or extra care to avoid hyperextending elbow and other joints.
 Weakened ligaments and muscles contribute to poor posture, which may contribute to other medical conditions.
 Isometric exercise avoids hyperextension and contributes to strength.

Other treatments 
 Bracing can be helpful for temporarily protecting unstable joints.

Epidemiology
Hypermobile joints occur in about 10 to 25% of the population.

See also
 Ligamentous laxity

References

External links 

Ehlers–Danlos syndrome
Disorders of fascia
Syndromes
Arthritis
Skeletal disorders
Rheumatology
Contortion